Jevgeņijs Drobots (Evgeny Pavlovich Drobot; 18 August 1946 – 27 June 2021) was a Latvian Russian politician and engineer. He worked as Deputy Chief Engineer of a chemical fiber plant in Daugavpils before serving on the Supreme Council of the Republic of Latvia from 1990 to 1993, elected from the 76th constituency of Daugavpils. He notably did not vote for the declaration On the Restoration of Independence of the Republic of Latvia. After his term in office, he joined the Latvian Russian Union and helped organize the Headquarters for the Protection of Russian Schools protests and Victory Day celebrations.

References

1946 births
2021 deaths
Soviet emigrants to Latvia
Communist Party of the Soviet Union members
People from Kirovsky District, Leningrad Oblast
Latvian Russian Union politicians